Kim Fletcher (born 17 September 1956) is a partner of the international corporate communications firm Brunswick, and a former journalist and newspaper editor.

Educated at Heversham Grammar School, Westmorland, Hertford College, Oxford, where he read law, and University College, Cardiff, where he received a postgraduate diploma in journalism, Fletcher worked for various newspapers before being appointed news editor and then deputy editor of The Sunday Telegraph. He left to become editor of The Independent on Sunday from 1998 to 1999, then returned to be Editorial Director of Hollinger's Telegraph New Media, the internet arm of Telegraph Group Limited, from 2000 to 2003 and Editorial Director of Telegraph Group Limited from 2003 to 2005.

Kim Fletcher is author of The Journalist's Handbook (Macmillan).  He is married to the journalist Sarah Sands, former editor of the Today programme, and former editor of the Evening Standard and The Sunday Telegraph.

References

External links
Journalisted - Articles by Kim Fletcher

1956 births
Living people
British male journalists
The Independent on Sunday editors
British newspaper editors
Alumni of Hertford College, Oxford